The Currency War of 2009–2011 was an episode of competitive devaluation which became prominent in the financial press in September 2010.  Competitive devaluation involves states competing with each other to achieve a relatively low valuation for their own currency, so as to assist their domestic industry. With the financial crises of 2008 the export sectors of many emerging economies have experienced declining orders, and from 2009 several states began or increased their levels of intervention to push down their currencies.

Both private sector analysts and politicians including Tim Geithner have suggested the phrase currency war overstates the extent of hostility, but the term has been widely used by the media since Brazil's finance ministers Guido Mantega September 2010 announced that a "currency war" had broken out.

Other commentators including world statesmen such as Manmohan Singh and Guido Mantega suggested a currency war was indeed underway and that the leading participants are China and the US, though since 2009 many other states have been taking measures to either devalue or at least check the appreciation of their currencies. The US does not acknowledge that it is practicing competitive devaluation and its official policy is to let the dollar float freely. While the US has taken no direct action to devalue its currency, there is close to universal consensus among analysts that its quantitative easing programmes exert downwards pressure on the dollar.

According to many analysts the currency war had largely fizzled out by mid-2011, though others including Mantega disagreed. As of March 2012, outbreaks of rhetoric were still occurring, with additional measures being adopted by countries like Brazil to control the appreciation of their currency. Yet by June, there were signs that currency misalignment had been levelling out in China and across the world, with even Mantega relaxing some of Brazils anti-appreciation controls. Alarms were raised concerning a possible second 21st currency war in January 2013, this time with the most apparent tension being between Japan and the Euro-zone.

Competitive devaluation in 2009
Following the financial crisis of 2008 widespread concern arose among advanced economies concerning the size of their deficits; they increasingly joined emerging economies in viewing export-led growth as their ideal strategy. In March 2009, even before international cooperation reached its peak with the 2009 G-20 London Summit Economist Ted Truman became one of the first to warn of the dangers of competitive devaluation breaking out. He also coined the phrase competitive non-appreciation.

On 27 September 2010, Brazilian Finance Minister Guido Mantega said that the world is "in the midst of an international currency war."
Numerous financial journalists agreed with Mantega's view, referring to recent interventions by various countries seeking to devalue their exchange rate including China, Japan, Colombia, Israel and Switzerland.

Other analysts asserted that fears of a currency war were exaggerated.
In September, senior policy makers such as International Monetary Fund (IMF) Managing Director Dominique Strauss-Kahn and US Treasury Secretary Tim Geithner were reported as saying the chances of a genuine currency war breaking out were low; however by early October, Strauss-Kahn was warning that the risk of a currency war was real. He also suggested the IMF could help resolve the trade imbalances which could be the underlying casus belli for conflicts over currency valuations. Mr Strauss-Kahn said that using currencies as weapons "is not a solution [and] it can even lead to a very bad situation. There’s no domestic solution to a global problem."

Daniel Tenengauzer, the head of emerging-market currency and rates strategy at Merrill Lynch, suggested talk of a currency war can be seen as "political posturing", noting that emerging economies had been intervening on a wider scale back in 2009. George Soros expressed concern saying "I share the growing concern about the misalignment of currencies. Brazil’s finance minister speaks of a latent currency war, and he is not far off the mark. It is in the currency markets where different economic policies and different economic and political systems interact and clash."

Considerable attention had been focused on China. For much of 2009 and 2010, China has been under pressure from the US to allow the yuan to appreciate. Between June and October 2010, China allowed a 2% appreciation of the yuan, but there are concerns from Western observers that China only relaxes her intervention when under heavy pressure. The fixed peg was not abandoned until just before the June G20 meeting, after which the yuan appreciated by about 1%, only to slowly devalue again until further US pressure in September when the yuan again began relatively steep appreciation, with the imminent September US Congressional hearings to discuss measures to force a revaluation.
Leading financial journalist Martin Wolf has suggested there may be advantages in western economies taking a more confrontational approach against China, which in recent years has been by far the biggest practitioner of competitive devaluation. Though he suggests that rather than using protectionist measures that may spark a trade war, a better tactic would be to use targeted capital controls against China to prevent them buying foreign assets in order to further devalue the yuan, as previously suggested by Centre for European Policy Studies director Daniel Gros.

Competitive devaluation in 2010

Negotiations at the 2010 annual IMF meeting
In the middle of October 2010, finance ministers congregated in Washington, D.C. for the 2010 annual IMF and World Bank meeting, which was expected to be dominated by talk of currency war. Just prior to the IMF meeting, the Institute of International Finance had called for leading countries to agree on a currency pact to aid the rebalancing of the world economy and to avert the threat of competitive devaluation.
The meeting was held amid warnings that weaker exchange rates risk hurting the global economy, which was already vulnerable due to the Global financial crisis. There was concern about tit-for-tat protectionism at a time when the rate of increase in global growth was already slowing.

Canadian Finance Minister Jim Flaherty said "This is a crucial time that we need to address the commitment of our leaders to free trade, that we avoid protectionist measures." His US counterpart Timothy Geithner added that "global rebalancing is not progressing as well as needed to avoid threats to the global economic recovery."
Various international finance ministers said the IMF should help abating the possibility of a currency war by encouraging initiatives to expand national economies without hurting that of other countries. The IMF, in turn, urged most developed countries to boost exports, and for some emerging markets to enhance domestic consumption and to let their currencies appreciate. Dominique Strauss-Kahn said the IMF would highlight the linkages between economies as part of a "systemic stability initiative". Its steering committee added that it should work on capital flows, exchange rate movements and the accumulation of capital reserves.
Strauss-Kahn also said "There is clearly the idea beginning to circulate that currencies can be used as a policy weapon...Translated into action, such an idea would represent a very serious risk to the global recovery...Any such approach would have a negative and very damaging longer-run impact."
Australia's Federal Treasurer, Wayne Swan played down rumours of a currency war saying global financial ministers were working in a coordinated way to deal with "exchange rate reform". However, the opposition's finance minister, Andrew Robb, warned that with some countries deliberately devaluing their currencies other countries may retaliate thus causing a "trade war", and he urged Swann to alert "all of these other major countries to the very damaging implications of a currency war".

During the IMF meeting there was disagreement based on conflicting views about how to sustain a recovery from the global recession. Countries led by the United States preferred flexible exchange rates, while others, led by China, resisted calls to appreciate their currency. The IMF meeting in Washington DC was inconclusive, as China rejected calls to allow rapid appreciation of its currency.
Currency war was scheduled to be discussed at November's G20 summit in Seoul.

In an article published after the IMF meeting the Financial Times reported there was little sign of fruitful co-operation, with China blaming America for causing problems to emerging markets with excessive quantitative easing, while America repeated its calls for further appreciation of the yuan. According to Cornell University's Eswar Prasad: "China's aggressive pushback against criticism of its currency policy by shifting the line of attack towards loose monetary policies and rising public debt in advanced economies reflects its growing assertiveness and strong resistance to international pressure."

The Financial Times reported the "battle lines were drawn" as China accused the US of destabilising emerging economies with a "ultra-loose monetary policy", and the US wanted the IMF to intensify focus on both the exchange rates and the reserve accumulation of China.
Reuters suggested a currency war is already underway, with both China and the United States "winning the race" to devalue their currencies while pushing up the value of the Euro, the Yen and the currencies of many emerging economies. However, it added that with increasing rhetoric everyone will lose out.

Martin Wolf has opined that the US will inevitably win a currency war and is concerned the adverse consequences will fall unequally on other countries, suggesting it is far better if a collaborative solution can be agreed on at the November G20.
A contrasting view was published on 19 October, with a paper from Chinese economist Huang Yiping arguing that the US did not win the last "currency war" with Japan, and has even less of a chance against China; but should focus instead on broader "structural adjustments" at the November 2010 G-20 Seoul summit.

Also writing for the Financial Times, Alan Beattie was less optimistic than Mr Wolf about the chances of a collaborative solution, as he considers China and America have too divergent views on currency to be able to co-operate. Speaking very shortly before the G20 summit was due to begin, Canadian Prime Minister Stephen Harper also expressed doubts that leaders would be able to agree on a solution.

Negotiations at the 2010 G20 summit

Discussion over currency war and imbalances dominated the G20 summit. Attending leaders such as Britain's David Cameron made statements suggesting good progress had been made. Yet according to most commentators no substantial agreement was reached, with the US largely unable to persuade other nations to endorse the measures it considers necessary to rebalance the global economy.  IMF managing director Dominique Strauss-Kahn said this particular summit was "more of a G20 debate than a G20 conclusion".

The communiqué issued after the meeting did include a commitment to support enhanced monitoring so growing imbalances can be better identified, and to work on a possible future agreement for  "indicative guidelines".

A report released after the summit by the IMF warned that without additional progress there is a risk of global imbalances approximately doubling to reach pre-crises levels by 2014.
The lack of any resolution by the G20 led to concerns from other countries not directly involved such as Australia; if the "currency war" continues they may be exposed to harmful upwards pressure on their exchange rates.

By December 2010, currency war was less of a hot topic and wasn't even on the agenda for the bilateral trade talks held between China and the US, but the issues still remain unresolved, with many emerging economies considering increased use of capital controls to cope with potentially de-stabilising capital inflows.

Competitive devaluation in 2011
January 2011 saw new interventions to prevent currency appreciation and volatility from Brazil, South Korea and even from Chile – a country with a reputation for avoiding government intervention in favour of free market policies. Brazil's finance minister Guido Mantega who had raised the alarm about a currency war back in September, warned that matters were beginning to escalate into a trade war. He expressed concerns about the economic policies of both China and the US.
By February, the US had stepped up diplomatic efforts to persuade emerging economies such as Brazil and India that China's intervention was the root cause of the currency war. However, the US once again refrained from labelling China a currency manipulator. A Treasury report said that allowing for their high inflation, China was on track for an annual appreciation of 10% since they relaxed their currency peg back in June 2010. However, treasury officials also suggested that this rate of appreciation is still insufficient either for the interests of the US, the wider global economy or even China itself.

By late February Bloomberg reported that talk of currency war had subsided, with several emerging economies choosing to allow currency appreciation as a way to combat inflation.
February saw the US dollar fall to its lowest level since 1973, based on comparison against a weighted basket composed of the currencies of its major trading partners and analysts began to converge on the view that the Feds QE2 program would begin to wind up by the middle of the year.
Analyses from both private and central banks agreed with the Fed's assessment that reducing global imbalances was in everyone's interests, saying also that various long-term trends would make the reduction likely to happen.
The IMFs February 2011 economic outlook report was generally positive about the global economy, but noted that so far little actual progress had been made in reducing imbalances.

March saw analysts from BNP Paribas report that the currency war had ended – governments of emerging economies were increasingly deciding to accept currency appreciation so as to mitigate rising food prices, one of the causes behind civil discontent driving the Arab Spring.
In April, the Financial Times joined Bloomberg in reporting that the currency war was beginning to fizzle out, again suggesting a key reason was the trend for emerging economies to allow currency appreciation as a means to offset inflation.
Although Brazil is one of the emerging countries that has recently abandoned intervening against appreciation, her finance minister Guido Mantega disagreed with suggestions that the 'currency war' is over, saying it is still on-going. In an April interview with the Wall Street Journal, Mantega spoke out against the loose monetary policies of advanced nations which have been aggravating inflation in emerging economies.

Unlike other emerging economies, China has so far chose to continue holding its currency down against the dollar, fighting inflation instead with interest rate rises. The rate rises cause even greater pressure from the markets for a currency appreciation, and to prevent this, at least in the months leading up to early 2011, China had to buy dollar assets at a faster rate than ever.
In May, Alan Beatie for the Financial Times suggested that the Currency War was not over, it had merely entered a lull, with the underlying tensions still unresolved.
In July 2011, Guido Mantega told the Financial Times that the struggle between China and the US was still ongoing, suggesting that several emerging economies including Brazil were still experiencing undesirable upwards pressure on their exchange rates.
As investor confidence in the global economic outlook fell in early August, Bloomberg suggested the currency war had entered a new phase. This followed renewed talk of a possible third round of quantitative easing by the US (QE3) and interventions over the first three days of August by Switzerland and Japan to push down the value of their currencies.

In September 2011 Gideon Rachman warned that continued excessive intervention by nations trying to hold down the value of their currencies could aggravate the risk of protectionism.
Guillermo Felices, who heads up forex research for Barclays Capital, suggested the currency war may intensify if the US, EU and UK begin an additional round of monetary easing.

Also in September, as part of her opening speech for the 66th United Nations Debate, and also in an article for the Financial Times, Brazilian president Dilma Rousseff called for the currency war to be ended by increased use of floating currencies and greater cooperation and solidarity among major economies, with exchange rate policies set for the good of all rather than having individual nations striving to gain an advantage for themselves.

Global perspectives

Developed economies

Anglosphere
The US, and to a lesser extent the UK, share a position where they have independent currencies in addition to twin deficits – both large current account deficits and large fiscal deficits.  Though austerity programmes can address their fiscal deficits, the effect of these can only be to move debt from the public to private sector, unless the countries begin earning more than they spend – in other words their overall debt can only be paid off by going into current account surplus. Lowering their exchange rates, especially against the yuan, is considered by government officials and by most economists as an important part of their approach to transition towards current account surpluses. The UK and US have not directly intervened to devalue their currencies, however their QE programmes have exerted downwards exchange rate pressure. In October 2010 analysts were expecting the UK and US to employ additional QE.
After Japan's intervention in the week of 5 October, there was speculation that the US Federal Reserve would also intervene to inject more money into the economy via another round of QE (QE2), hence for a short time after the dollar depreciated slightly.

The Daily Telegraph reported that while countries which have trade surpluses with the United States were trying to devalue or prevent appreciation of their currencies— including China, Japan, Korea, Thailand, and Switzerland —the US was starting to retaliate with measures such as the Reform for Fair Trade Act. It then said:
The atomic bomb, of course, is quantitative easing by the Federal Reserve. America has in effect issued an ultimatum to China and G20: either you stop this predatory behaviour and agree to some formula for global rebalancing, or we will deploy QE2 'a l’outrance' to flood your economies with excess liquidity. We will cause you to overheat and drive up your wage costs. We will impose a de facto currency revaluation by more brutal and disruptive means, and there is little you can do to stop it. Pick your poison.

The Telegraph went on to say, however, that while a second round of quantitative easing may be required at a later date, there would soon be a "dangerous moment" that could backfire against the US with a weak dollar. It cited a "rush into oil and resources" and a consequent risk that a "commodity shock" could occur before a new stimulus. Thus, "US risks gambling away the 'exorbitant privilege' it has enjoyed for two-thirds of a century as currency hegemon."

By mid October 2010, the dollar had dropped 7% since a 27 August speech by Federal Reserve Chairman Ben Bernanke in which he said there was a possibility of further easing monetary policy. On 18 October, US Treasury Secretary Tim Geithner stated "It is very important for people to understand that the United States of America and no country around the world can devalue its way to prosperity and competitiveness." Following this statement the value of the dollar rose as speculators calculated that at least in the short term it would be less likely for the US to intentionally devalue its currency.

In late October the US unveiled a suggestion to address the broader issues relating to trade imbalances by introducing indicative guidelines that for most countries would target a maximum current account surplus of 4% of GDP. While the plan attracted immediate opposition, the general notion of limiting excessive surpluses achieved cautious support at the October meeting of G20 finance ministers, including from China.
By early November opposition from Germany and China had strengthened, leading the US to apparently back down from the plan, though speaking three days before the November G20 summit President Obama suggested the US would be pushing hard for an aggressive reduction of global imbalances.

Australia, Canada and New Zealand all appear to have refrained from intervening against their currencies or from imposing new capital controls and have each seen substantial appreciation of their currencies in 2010. However both Australia and Canada have strong economies and are rich in natural resources.   According to Moody's, negative effects from New Zealand's appreciation is offset by the fact that her currency has depreciated with respect to Australia, her biggest customer.

Eurozone
The Eurozone is a special case where some members, principally Germany, enjoy a large current account surplus and so could accept or even benefit from currency appreciation.  Other countries though such as Greece, Spain, Portugal and Ireland have twin deficits and so to a large extent would benefit from a depreciation.  While the European Central Bank (ECB) did practice some QE in 2009, this was to a much lower extent than the US or UK, and they did not deploy a second round. The value of the Euro has been effectively left to float, and in fact early in 2010 central authorities intervened to defend the Euro's value against the market. Following the generally positive results from bank stress testing that were released in summer, market participants stopped speculating against the Euro, and the currency has tended to rise as a result of other countries practicing competitive devaluation. A major driver for the rise in the Euro in the latter half of 2010 was China's purchase of Euro-denominated bonds. While China's intervention was in some ways helpful for the Eurozone, it also generated concern with several European officials speaking out against the action. These officials included:  ECB governor Jean-Claude Trichet and Eurogroup president Jean-Claude Juncker.

Japan
Japan also has a large current account surplus, and in 2009 and 2010 the country allowed the Yen to appreciate. However, in September 2010 Japan twice intervened to effect a devaluation. Japan has a number of challenges that limit its ability to allow ongoing currency appreciation, including an aging population, high government debt (though not net debt as it has high private savings) and vulnerability to deflation. The September devaluation did not draw widespread international condemnation. Within a couple of weeks upwards pressure on the Yen from the markets had almost entirely undone the effect of the intervention. However shortly after the March 2011 earthquake, other G7 nations joined Japan in a rare act of solidarity, selling billions of Yen to help Japan devalue its currency against pressure from speculators who were betting on a further appreciation, as insurance firms recalled funds from abroad.

Emerging markets

BRIC
Speaking in October 2010, Russian Finance Minister Alexei Kudrin said it was too early too make "a decision regarding currency exchange rates. Such measures aren’t yet sufficiently formulated." He also stated other BRIC countries support Russia in opposing any US push to limit the ability of governments to control their currencies.

India has largely taken a neutral position on the currency war, advocating a balanced solution with give and take by both China and the US, though along with Brazil she has been one of the few emerging economies to occasionally criticise China's holding down of the Yuan.
Prime Minister Manmohan Singh suggested the currency war can be viewed as part of a power struggle between the US and China and that India will have to play a role to ensure a balanced outcome.

China has a large current account surplus and huge foreign reserves along with the potential to transition towards domestic demand-led growth, allowing it to appreciate the yuan and reduce the current account surplus while still maintaining high GDP growth and decreasing unemployment.
However, its economy has long been geared towards export-led growth, and hence a substantial appreciation could cause a sharp rise in unemployment, as China's premier warned in early October 2010. Economic commentators such as Martin Wolf have speculated that China is wary of complying with pressure to allow a substantial currency appreciation as she considers the long period of stagnation Japan experienced after the Plaza accord as in part resulting from Japan allowing a substantial appreciation of her currency against the dollar.

Chinese premier Wen Jiabao has stated that reforms to re-balance the Chinese economy away from its current dependency on exports are well underway and that the yuan is being allowed to gradually appreciate. He warned that if China is forced to revalue its currency too fast that it would lead to social unrest in China, bankruptcy for export dependent companies and  "disaster for the world".
In October, China posted a record surge in its foreign exchange reserves, which was seen as a "target around the neck of China’s exchange rate regime" in the effort to get the country to allow its currency to appreciate.
In reaction, Geithner suggested China's attempts at limiting gains were the reason for capital controls and currency-market interventions in other emerging economies. "What’s happening is, as China holds its currency down, their currencies are moving up and they’re having to work very hard to make sure they’re not at an unfair disadvantage with China." Bloomberg pointed out at that countries such as Brazil, South Korea and Thailand sold their respective currencies in the weeks preceding the report to curb gains and support export. South Korea, Taiwan, Brazil, Colombia and Russia were also tightening rules to limit capital flows and avoid swings in their currencies.

However, the Obama administration decided to postpone the decision to label China a "currency manipulator" until after the G20 summit in South Korea and the United States elections, 2010.
China issued its own "warning" against being made a "scapegoat" for the US's failings.
China accused the US of waging the currency war and that it has "exercised financial policies characterised as 'economic egoism.'"
In April 2011, the Financial Times reported that Chinese officials have signalled 2016 as a date when they expect to stop intervening against their currency by buying dollar assets.

Latin America
Brazil is a large economy which has generally allowed their currency to float freely, with the exception of some low level interventions to counter large capital inflows resulting from major stock sales. As a result, since early 2009 her currency has risen substantially against the dollar, with Goldman Sachs saying the real is the most over valued currency in the world. In October 2010, Brazil began increasing her capital controls, doubling a tax on foreign purchases of fixed-income assets to 4 percent so as to curb the real's appreciation to a two-year.  On 18 October, Brazil sought to curb the real's gains by raising taxed capital inflow on fixed-income assets by 2% to 6% and taxed inflows for margin deposits on futures to 6% from 0.38%.

Chile said it would implement capital controls to curb gains in the Chilean peso, which had strengthened the most in the region in the middle of 2010, citing Chile's mixed in the 1990s. Finance Minister Felipe Larrain suggested that less public spending is "one of the best ways" to prevent appreciation and that "short-term capital I don’t want, so they disguise it as long-term capital and they are really playing with the interest rate differential."

Colombia and Costa Rica also initiated programmes to buy dollars to check their currency gains.

Other Asian economies
In Oct 2010, Thai Finance Minister Korn Chatikavanij said his country faces a "challenge" as the appreciation of the baht was making Thai exports less competitive, and thus he needed to try to reduce volatility in the currency but "a country like ours can[not] forcibly change the fundamental direction of our currency." Over the first nine months of 2010 the baht had risen in value by 11 percent, the second largest appreciation of Asia's 11 most heavily traded currencies. There were also concerns that exports may slow: sales to foreigners make up almost two-thirds of Thai's economic activity. Prime Minister Abhisit Vejjajiva also said Thailand may step up efforts to prevent currency appreciation from hurting its exporters.

Others
Africa was hit harder by the global financial crises than other emerging regions. African countries may not however be as adversely affected by a currency war, as one of the regions problems is the collapse of foreign investment following the crisis, so increased international investment resulting from QE2 may actually help Africa rather than excessively drive up its currencies as is feared for other emerging regions.
However South African Finance Minister Pravin Gordhan has warned that currency wars could lead to "trade wars" if allowed to continue.

The threat of a currency war would adversely affect the Caricom community because the various currencies are either tied to or float against the US dollar. Export and tourism earnings are closely linked to the US or Europe, thus there is a strong dependency on the said regions unlike Latin America which has diversified its markets in the previous decade.

Competitive devaluation in 2012
Early figures for February 2012 suggested that China had experienced a monthly trade deficit of $31.5bn, her largest for almost 15 years. By March this had prompted several Chinese officials to suggest the time was approaching for them to halt the appreciation of the Renimbi, with several independent analysts agreeing this would be reasonable. However China still has a substantial bi-lateral trade surplus with the US, and Financial Times journalists have suggested that if China returned to a fixed peg against the dollar this could re-ignite the Currency War, especially if the move coincided with the US presidential election campaign. Also in March 2012, Brazil's president Rousseff said her country was still experiencing undesirable upwards pressure on her currency, with her Finance Minister Guido Mantega saying Brazil will no longer "play the fool" and allow others to get away with competitive devaluation, announcing new measures aimed at limiting further appreciation for the Real.

In June 2012, the Financial Times reported that while international trade remained a source of contention, concerns over currency war had receded, along with signs that major currencies such as the Renminbi were now much less undervalued than they had been a year previously.  Brazil currency had fallen substantially from its peak value against the dollar, allowing Mantega to begin rolling back anti-appreciation measures.
In July, the IMF downgraded its assessment of the degree to which the Renminbi is undervalued from "substantially" to "moderately".  However, Chinese officials were not pleased, suggesting that their exchange rate is no longer undervalued at all. Whereas in the US, presidential candidate Mitt Romney retains his pledge to brand China as a currency manipulator from his first day of office.

In October, Alan Beatie and Alice Ross for the Financial Times noted that the global trade imbalances which had driven the currency war have been sharply reduced. However, they suggest that without further reforms, the imbalances may soon widen again. They also note that Mantega once more raised the alarm about competitive devaluation, following the United States's launch of QE3 in September.

Competitive devaluation in 2013
In mid January 2013, Japan's central bank signaled the intention to launch an open ended bond buying programme which would likely devalue the yen. This resulted in numerous senior central bankers and finance ministers warning of a possible fresh round of currency war. First to raise the alarm was Alexei Ulyukayev, the first deputy chairman at Russia's central bank. He was later joined by many others including Bahk Jae-wan, the finance minister for South Korea, and by Jens Weidmann, president of the Bundesbank. Weidmann held the view that interventions during the 2009-11 period were not intense enough to count as competitive devaluation, but that a genuine currency war is now a real possibility. Japan's economy minister Akira Amari has said that the Bank of Japan's bond buying programme is intended to combat deflation, and not to weaken the yen. Most commentators have asserted that if a new round of competitive devaluation occurs it would be harmful for the global economy.  However some analysts have stated that Japan's planned actions could be in the long term interests of the rest of the world; just as he did for the 2010-11 incident, economist Barry Eichengreen has suggested that even if many other countries start intervening against their currencies it could boost growth worldwide, as the effects would be similar to semi-coordinated global monetary expansion. Other analysts have expressed skepticism about the risk of a war breaking out, with Marc Chandler, chief currency strategist at Brown Brothers Harriman, advising that: "A real currency war remains a remote possibility."

See also
Comparison with the Great Depression currency war
Trade war

Notes and citations

References

External links
 Global economy: Going head to head   article showing various international perspectives (Financial Times, Oct 2010)
 Data visualization from OECD, to see how imbalances have developed since 1990, select 'Current account imbalances' on the stories tab, then move the date slider.  ( OECD 2010 )
 Why China's exchange rate is a red herring alternative view by the chairman of Intelligence Capital, Eswar Prasad, suggesting those advocating for China to appreciate are misguided (VoxEU, April 2010).
 Q. What is a 'currency war'? – view from a journalist in Korea, the hosts of the Nov 2010 G20 summit. (Korea Joongang, Oct 2010)
 Brazil's Currecny wars – a 'real' problem  – introductory article from a South American magazine (SoundsandColours.com, Oct 2010)
 What's the currency war about? introductory article from the BBC (Oct 2010)
 Currency wars: a handy guide – Analyses from the Royal Bank of Scotland Group concerning the potential for currency war in 2013.

International macroeconomics
Great Recession
Monetary hegemony
Trade wars